St. Helens RUFC are a rugby union club, not to be confused with St Helens R.F.C., who were based in St Helens, Merseyside. St Helens RUFC were founded in 1919 as St. Helens Old Boys with former pupils of Cowley High forming the majority of the team.

Liverpool FC (a rugby union club, not to be confused with the association football team of the same name) and St. Helens RUFC merged in 1986 and play at Moss Lane the former St Helens club's ground.

A number of the team achieved international honours; Alan 'Ned' Ashcroft, John Horton, Nigel Heslop and the current club President Ray French who gained International honours in both League and Union. Ray French is currently the President of the merged club, Liverpool St Helens F.C.

English rugby union teams
Rugby Union football club